This is a list of game titles released for the Commodore 64 personal computer system, sorted alphabetically.

N

NARC
NATO Commander
Nautilus
Navy SEALS
Nebulus
Necromancer
Nemesis
Nemesis: The Warlock
Neptune's Daughters
Nether Earth
Netherworld
Neuromancer
Neutral Zone
New York City
The NewZealand Story
Newcomer
Nexus
Night Driver
Night Shift
A Nightmare on Elm Street
Nightshade
Nine Princes In Amber
Ninja
Ninja Commando
Ninja Gaiden
Ninja Hamster
Ninja Master
Ninja Rabbits
Ninja Spirit
The Ninja Warriors
Nobby the Aardvark
Nodes of Yesod
Nonterraqueous
Nord and Bert Couldn't Make Head or Tail of It
North & South
NorthStar
Norway 1985
Nosferatu the Vampyre

O

Octapolis
Odell Lake
Oil Barons
Oil's Well
Oink!
Olli & Lissa 3
Ollie's Follies
Omega
Omega Race
On The Moon
On-Court Tennis
One Man and His Droid
One on One: Dr. J vs. Larry Bird
Operation Thunderbolt
Operation Wolf
Oregon
OsWALD
Out of this World
Out Run
Out Run Europa
Outlaws
Overlander
Overlord
Overrun!

P

P. P. Hammer and his Pneumatic Weapon
Pac-Land
Pac-Man
Pac-Mania
Painterboy
Pandora
Panic
Pang (also known as Buster Bros.)
Panther
Panzer Strike
Paperboy
Paperboy 2
Paradroid
Paragon
Parallax
The Paranoia Complex
Paratroopers
Park Patrol
Pastfinder
Patton Versus Rommel
The Pawn
PC Fuzz
Pedro
Penetrator
Pengo
Periscope Up
Perry Mason: The Case of the Mandarin Murder
Perseus and Andromeda
Persian Gulf Inferno
Peter Pack Rat
Peter Shilton's Handball Maradona
Phantasie
Phantasie II
Phantasie III
Phantom of the Asteroid
Pharaoh's Curse
Pharaoh's Revenge
PHM Pegasus
Phobia
Pilgrim
Pinball Construction Set
Pinball Wizard (1984 video game)
Pink Panther
Pipe Mania
Piracy
Pirate Adventure
Pirates
Pit-Fighter
Pitfall!
Pitfall II: Lost Caverns
Pitstop
Pitstop II
Planet X2
Planetfall
Platoon
Plotting
Plundered Hearts
Pogo Joe
Pole Position
Pole Position II
Police Cadet
Pool of Radiance
Pooyan
PopMan
Popeye
Portal
Poster Paster
Postman Pat
Postman Pat II
Postman Pat III
Pot Panic
Potty Painter
Potty Pigeon
Power At Sea
Power Drift
Power!
Predator
President Elect
The President Is Missing
Press Your Luck
The Price Is Right
Prince of Persia
Pro Boxing Simulator
Professional Ski Simulator
Project Firestart
Project Space Station
Project Stealth Fighter
Proof of Destruction
Psi-5 Trading Company
PSI Warrior
Psycho Hopper
Psycho Soldier
Pub Games
Pub Trivia
Puffy's Saga
Punchy
Purple Turtles
Puzzle Panic
Puzzlenoid
Puzznic
Pyjamarama
The Pyramid

Q

Q*bert
Qix
Quake Minus One
Quango
Quartet
Quasimodo
Quedex
The Quest
A Question of Sport
Questron
Quo Vadis

R

R-Type
Racing Destruction Set
Rack 'Em
Radar Rat Race
Rags to Riches
Raid on Bungeling Bay
Raid over Moscow
Rainbow Islands
Rail Boss
The Railroad Works
Rally Cross Simulator
Rally Racer
Rally Speedway
Rambo
Rambo: First Blood Part II
Rambo III
Rampage
Rampart
Ranarama
Rasputin
Rastan Saga
Rasterscan
The Rats
Ratsplat
RDF 1985
Reach for the Stars
Reader Rabbit
The Real Ghostbusters
Realm of Impossibility
Realms of Darkness
Rebel Planet
Rebounder
Red Arrows
Red Heat
Red Max
Red Storm Rising
Renaissance
Rendezvous with Rama
Renegade
Renegade III: The Final Chapter
Repton (Sirius Software)
Repton (Superior Software)
Rescue on Fractalus!
Rescue Squad
Return of the Mutant Camels
Revenge of the Mutant Camels
Revs
Revs+
Rick Dangerous
Rick Dangerous 2
Richard Petty's Talladega
Ricochet
Rigel's Revenge
Ring of Power
Risk
River Raid
River Rescue
Road to Moscow
Road Raider
Road Runner
RoadBlasters
Roadwar 2000
Roadwars
Robbers of the Lost Tomb
Robin Hood
Robin Hood: Legend Quest
Robin Smith's International Cricket
Robin of the Wood
RoboCop
RoboCop 2
RoboCop 3
Robot Rascals
Robotfindskitten
Robotron: 2084
Rock'n Wrestle
Rock'n Bolt
Rock'n Roll
Rock Star Ate My Hamster
Rocket Ranger
Rocketball
The Rocky Horror Show
Rockford
Rocky's Boots
Rod Land
Rogue
Rogue Trooper
Roland's Rat Race
Rollaround
Roller Coaster Rumbler
Rolling Ronnie
Rolling Thunder
Rubicon
Rugby: The World Cup
The Running Man
Run the Gauntlet
Rubicon
Rupert and the Ice Castle
Rupert and the Toymaker's Party
Rush'n Attack (also known as Green Beret)
Rygar

S

S.T.U.N. Runner
Sabotage
Saboteur
Saboteur II: Avenging Angel
Sabre Wulf
The Sacred Armour of Antiriad
Saint Dragon
Salamander
Samantha Fox Strip Poker
Sammy Lightfoot
Samurai Trilogy
Samurai Warrior: The Battles of Usagi Yojimbo
Sanxion
Saracen
Sargon II
Sargon III
SAS Combat Simulator
Saucer Attack
Savage
Savage Pond
Save New York
Scapeghost
Scarabaeus
Scooby-Doo
Scooby-Doo and Scrappy-Doo
Scramble Spirits
The Secret Diary of Adrian Mole, Aged 13¾
Scramble
SDI
Se-Kaa of Assiah
Seabase Delta
Seafox
Search for the Titanic
Seastalker
The Secret of Bastow Manor
Secret of the Silver Blades
Sentinel Worlds I: Future Magic
The Sentinel
The Serpent's Star
Serpentine
Seven Cities of Gold
Seymour Goes to Hollywood
Shackled
Shadow Dancer
Shadow Fighter
Shadow of the Beast
Shadowfire
Shadows of Mordor
Shamus
Shamus Case II
Shanghai
Shanghai Karate
Shao-Lin's Road
Shard of Spring
Sheep in Space
Sherlock: The Riddle of the Crown Jewels
Shinobi
Shockway Rider
Shoot'Em-Up Construction Kit
Short Circuit
Side Arms
Sidewize
Sierra Championship Boxing
Sigma 7
The Simpsons: Bart vs. the Space Mutants
The Simpsons Arcade Game
Silent Service
Silicon Dreams
Silkworm
SimCity
Sinbad and the Throne of the Falcon
Siren City
Skate Crazy
Skate or Die!
Skateball
Skaterock
Ski or Die
Skool Daze
Skramble
Sky Runner
Sky Shark
Skyfox
Skyfox II: The Cygnus Conflict
Slap Fight
Slap Shot
Slayer
Sleepwalker
Slicks
Slightly Magic
Sly Spy
Smash TV
Snare
Snokie
Snooker
Snoopy
Soccer Boss
Soft Aid
Software Star
Soldier of Fortune
Solo Flight
Solomon's Key
Son of Blagger
Sorcerer
Sorcerer Lord
Soul of a Robot
Southern Belle
Space Action
Space Gun
Space Harrier
Space Harrier II
Space Pilot
Space Pilot II
Space Rogue
Space Taxi
Special Criminal Investigation
Speed King
Speedball
Speedball 2
Spellbound
Spellbound Dizzy
Spellbreaker
Spelunker
Spider-Man and Captain America in Doctor Doom's Revenge
Spiky Harold
Spindizzy
Spirit of Adventure
Spirit of the Stones
Spitfire Ace
Spitting Image
Splat!
Split Personalities
Spooks
Spore
Sport of Kings
Sporting Triangles
Spriteman
Spy Hunter
Spy vs. Spy
Spy vs. Spy II: The Island Caper
Spy vs. Spy III: Arctic Antics
The Spy Who Loved Me
Spy's Demise
Squirm
Squish 'em
The Staff of Karnath
Stalag 23
The Standing Stones
Star Control
Star Fire
Star Fleet I: The War Begins
Star League Baseball
Star Lifter
Star Paws
Star Raiders II
Star Soldier
Star Trader
Star Trek
Star Trek: The Kobayashi Alternative
Star Trek: The Promethean Prophecy
Star Trek: The Rebel Universe
Star Wars (1983)
Star Wars (Domark)
Star Wars: Return of the Jedi
Star Wars: The Empire Strikes Back
Star Wreck
Starcross
Starflight
Starfox
Stargate
Starglider
Starquake
Stationfall
Steel
Steel Thunder
Steg
Stellar 7
Stifflip & Co.
Stir Crazy featuring BoBo
Stix
Stock Car
Stop the Express
Storm
Storm Warrior
Stormbringer
Stormlord
Stormtrooper
Strange Odyssey
Streaker
Street Beat
Street Fighter
Street Fighter II: The World Warrior
Street Hawk
Street Sports Baseball
Street Sports Basketball
Streets of London
Street Rod
Street Rod 2
Street Surfer
Strider
Strider II
Strike
Strike Fleet
Strike Force Harrier
Strip Poker
Strip Poker II
Striker
Stunt Car Racer
Sub Battle Simulator
Subsunk
Subterranea
Suicide Express
Summer Games
Summer Games II
Super Bowl 1986
Super Bowl Sunday
Super Bunny
Super Cars
Super Cars II
Super Cycle
Super Gran
Super Gran: The Adventure
Super Gridder
Super Hang-On
Super Huey
Super Huey II
Super Monaco GP
Super OsWALD
Super Pac-Man
Super Password
Super Pipeline
Super Pipeline II
Super Robin Hood
Super Scramble Simulator
Super Skramble!
Super Spring
Super Sprint
Super Sprint II
Super Trolley
The SuperCan
Superman: The Game
Superman: The Man of Steel
Superstar Ice Hockey
Supremacy
Survivors
Suspect
Suspended
S.W.A.T.
SWIV
Swoop
Sword of Fargoal
Sword of Fred
Sword of Honour
The Sword of Kadash
Synetic
System 15000

T

T.A.N.K.
Tag Team Wrestling
Tai-Pan
Tales of Lore
Tales of the Arabian Nights
Tapper
Targ
Target Renegade
Task III
Tass Times in Tonetown
Tau Ceti
Techno Cop
Teenage Mutant Ninja Turtles
Teenage Mutant Ninja Turtles II: The Arcade Game
Telengard
Temple of Apshai
Terra Cresta
Terrormolinos
Test Drive
Test Drive II
Terra Quest
Terry's Big Adventure
Terminator 2: Judgment Day
Test Master
Thanatos
The NeverEnding Story
Theatre Europe
They Stole A Million
Thing On A Spring
Thing Bounces Back
Thomas the Tank Engine and Friends
The Thompson Twins Adventure
The Three Stooges
Three Weeks in Paradise
Thrust
Thrust II
Thud Ridge: American Aces In 'Nam
Thunderbirds
Thunder Blade
Thundercats
ThunderJaws
Tiger Road
Tilt
Time and Magik
Time Pilot
Timesearch
Times of Lore
Time Tunnel
Tintin on the Moon
Tir Na Nog
Titan
Tom & Jerry
To Hell and Back
Tomcat
Tony La Russa Baseball
Toobin
Top Gun
Total Eclipse
Total Recall
Toy Bizarre
Track & Field
Tracksuit Manager
Trailblazer
The Train: Escape to Normandy
Train Robbers
Trans World
The Transformers
Transformers: The Battle to Save the Earth
Transylvania
Transylvania III: Vanquish The Night
Trantor: The Last Stormtrooper
The Trap Door
Trashman
TRAZ
Treasure Island
Treasure Island Dizzy
Triton
Trollie Wallie
Troll's Tale
Trolls and Tribulations
Troy It!
Tuk's Adventure
Turbo 64
Turbo Esprit
Turbo Outrun
Turbo the Tortoise
Turn It
Turrican
Turrican II: The Final Fight
TV Sports Football
Twin Kingdom Valley
Twinworld
Type Attack

U

Uchi Mata
U.N. Squadron
Ugh!
Ultima I: The First Age of Darkness
Ultima II: The Revenge of the Enchantress
Ultima III: Exodus
Ultima IV: Quest of the Avatar
Ultima V: Warriors of Destiny
Ultima VI: The False Prophet
Ultimate Wizard
Ulysses and the Golden Fleece
Under Fire!
Underwurlde
Uninvited
Unitrax
Up'n Down
Up Periscope
Urban Upstart
Uridium
Uridium Plus
Uuno Turhapuro muuttaa maalle

V

V
Valhalla
The Valley
Vampire
Vendetta
Victory Road
Video Meanies
A View to a Kill
Vigilante
Vikings
Vindicators
Vixen
Viz: The Game
Volfied
Voodoo Castle
Vultures

W

W.A.R.
Wanted: Monty Mole
War in Middle Earth
War of the Lance
Wargame Construction Set
Warhawk
Wasteland
Waterline
Waxworks
The Way of the Exploding Fist (see also Exploding Fist II: The Legend Continues)
Way of the Tiger
Way of the Tiger II: Avenger
Wayout
WEC Le Mans
Weird Dreams
Welltris
Werewolves of London
Wheel of Fortune
Wheeling Wallie
Where in the U.S.A. is Carmen Sandiego?
Where in the World is Carmen Sandiego?
Where in Time is Carmen Sandiego?
Who Dares Wins
Who Dares Wins II
Who Framed Roger Rabbit
Wicked
William Wobbler
Windwalker, (Moebius II)
Wings of Fury
Winnie the Pooh in the Hundred Acre Wood
Winter Games
Wishbringer
The Witness
Wizard
Wizard and the Princess
Wizard of Wor
Wizard Warz
Wizard's Crown
Wizardry
Wizardry II: The Knight of Diamonds
Wizardry III: Legacy of Llylgamyn
Wizardry V: Heart of the Maelstrom
Wizardry: Proving Grounds of the Mad Overlord
Wizball
Wolfman
Wonder Boy
Wonder Boy in Monster Land
Wooden Ships and Iron Men
Woody The Worm
World Championship Soccer
World Class Leaderboard
World Cup 90: Arcade Soccer
World Cup Carnival
World Cup Cricket (1985 video game)
World Cup Football (1984 video game)
World Cup Italia '90
World Cup Soccer (1985 video game)
World Cup Soccer: Italia '90
World Games
World Karate Champion
World of Pirates
World Rugby
World Tour Golf
Worms?
Wrath of Denethor
Wrath of the Demon
WWF European Rampage Tour
WWF WrestleMania

X

X-Men: Madness in Murderworld
X-Out
Xenomorph
Xenon
Xenophobe
Xevious
XOR
Xyphus
Xzap

Y

Yatzy
Yes, Prime Minister
Yie Ar Kung-Fu
Yie Ar Kung-Fu II
Yogi Bear
Yogi's Great Escape
The Young Ones

Z

Z
Zak McKracken and the Alien Mindbenders
Zamzara
Zaxxon
Zeppelin
Zig Zag
Zim Sala Bim
Zoids: The Battle Begins
Zolo
Zombi
Zone Ranger
Zone Six
Zoom!
Zork I
Zork II - The Wizard of Frobozz
Zork III - The Dungeon Master
Zork: The Undiscovered Underground
Zorro
Zub
Zuul
Zybex
Zynaps
Zzzzz

See also 
List of Commodore 64 games
List of Commodore 64 games (A-M)

References

N-Z
Commodore 64: N-Z